Arnold Hunter (born 15 March 1980) is a Northern Irish professional football referee. He has been a full international for FIFA since 2011.

Hunter became a referee following a playing career, in which he took part as a goalkeeper.  On 7 July 2011, Hunter made his European debut in a match between FC Lusitanos and NK Varaždin in a UEFA Europa League first qualifying round match. His first international match was between Armenia and Malta on 7 June 2013. Hunter's first Europa League group stage appointment was for the match between Villarreal and Apollon Limassol in October 2014.

References

External links 
 
 
 
 

1980 births
Association football referees from Northern Ireland
People from Enniskillen
Living people